Thaḷī is a Lahnda dialect spoken in parts of the Pakistani provinces of Punjab and Khyber Pakhtunkhwa. It has a widespread area, starting from Tank to Muzzafargarh on the eastern end of the Indus River and from Bannu running down to D I khan at the western end of the Indus River. It is classified as a northern dialect of Saraiki, although it has also been described as transitional between Shahpuri and the central Saraiki Multani dialect. Its name derives from the Thal Desert.

Thali is one of several Saraiki dialects that are commonly known as Jaṭkī.
It is spoken in Khushab District and parts of the former Shahpur District where it is known as Thaḷī. Its local name in Jhang District is Thaḷochṛī. In Dera Ismail Khan District it goes by the name of Ḍerāwāl or Derawali, and in Mianwali and Bannu districts it is known as Hindko or Mulkī. A dialect of Thali spoken in the northeast is known as Kacchī. Inhabitants of Dera Ismail Khan District, presumably speakers of this dialect, variously identify their language as Saraiki or Hindko. Likewise for those living in Mianwali District, who identify their language as either Punjabi or Saraiki.

Thali is spoken in the following districts of Punjab Province and districts of Kyber Pakhtunkha Province:

Layyah District
parts of Muzaffargarh District
Dera Ismail Khan District
Tank District
Lakki Marwat District
Bhakkar District
parts of Mianwali District

References

Bibliography
 

 The account of Thali here is based entirely on Grierson's Linguistic Survey of India.
 (requires registration).

Languages of Pakistan
Punjabi dialects